Rock Festival is a live album by The Youngbloods and was released in 1970.  It reached #80 on the Billboard Top LPs chart.

The album featured the single "It's a Lovely Day", which did not chart.

Track listing
 "It's a Lovely Day" (Jesse Colin Young) – 2:35
 "Faster All the Time" (Lowell Levinger) – 3:55
 "Prelude" (Levinger, Young) – 1:01
 "On Beautiful Lake Spenard" (Levinger) – 4:56
 "Josiane" (Young) – 5:23
 "Sea Cow Boogie" (Levinger, Young) – 0:22
 "Fiddler a Dram" (Levinger) – 5:12
 "Misty Roses" (Tim Hardin) – 4:05
 "Interlude" (Levinger) – 2:12
 "Peepin' 'N' Hidin' (Baby, What You Want Me To Do)" (Jimmy Reed) – 5:06
 "Ice Bag" (Levinger, Young) – 2:22

Recording dates
March 29, 1970 (at The Family Dog on the Great Highway in San Francisco, California)
April 16, 1970 (at The Barn in Marshall, California)
April 18, 1970 (at the University of Santa Clara)
May 19, 1970 (at Provo Park in Berkeley, California)
July 21, 1970 (at Pacific High Recording in San Francisco, California)

Charts

References

1970 live albums
The Youngbloods albums